Dominika Nociarová (born 13 April 1984) is a former professional tennis player from Slovakia.

Biography
Nociarová, a right-handed player from Banská Bystrica, had a highest junior ranking of 29 and made the quarterfinals of the Orange Bowl in 2000, as a qualifier.

In 2002, she had her breakthrough year on the pro tour when she won three ITF titles. 

She made her only WTA Tour main-draw appearance at the 2004 Budapest Grand Prix as a lucky loser from qualifying and was beaten in the first round by eventual champion, Jelena Jankovic.

At the 2011 Summer Universiade, she represented Slovakia in singles and doubles.

ITF finals

Singles: 11 (6–5)

References

External links
 
 

1984 births
Living people
Slovak female tennis players
Sportspeople from Banská Bystrica
21st-century Slovak women